Limonia can mean:

Living things
 Limonia (fly), an insect genus
 Limonia (plant), a flowering plant genus

Other
 Limonia (food), an Italian recipe

Genus disambiguation pages